Our Days is the fourth extended play by South Korean group SG Wannabe. It was released on November 19, 2016, by CJ E&M Music and B2M Entertainment. The EP consists of five songs, being "I'm Missing You" the title track. A music video for the title track was also released on November 19.

The EP was a moderate success peaking at number 17 on the Gaon Album Chart. It has sold 3,553 physical copies as of November 2016.

Release 
The EP was released on November 19, 2016, through several music portals, including MelOn, and iTunes, for the global market.

Promotion

Single 
"I'm Missing You" was released as the title track in conjunction with the EP on November 19, 2016. The song entered at number 66 on the Gaon Digital Chart on the chart issue dated November 13–19, 2016, with 27,943 downloads sold. In its second week, the song peaked at number 30, with 44,797 downloads sold and 1,169,683 streams. The song entered at number 90 on the chart for the month of November 2016, with 80,034 downloads sold. A music video for the song was also released on November 19.

Commercial performance 
Our Days entered and peaked at number 17 on the Gaon Album Chart on the chart issue dated November 13–19, 2016. In its second week, the EP fell to number 26 and climbed to 25 the following week, before dropping the chart.

The EP entered at number 38 on the chart for the month of November 2016, with 3,553 physical copies sold.

Track listing 
Digital download

Charts

Release history

References 

2016 EPs
SG Wannabe albums
Korean-language EPs